Johannes Kornhuber (born September 11, 1959) is a German psychiatrist and psychotherapist.

Life

Kornhuber worked in the Department of Psychiatry at the University of Würzburg, Germany, as Postdoctoral Fellow, Resident and Supervising Physician. In 1996 he obtained an appointment to a full professorship in the Department of Psychiatry at the University of Göttingen, Germany, where he was Chairman of the Gerontopsychiatric Section. Since 2000, Kornhuber has been a full professor and chairman in the Department of Psychiatry at the University of Erlangen-Nuremberg, Germany.

Work

His research interests include the pathophysiology of Alzheimer’s disease, the early diagnosis and treatment of dementia syndromes, the pathophysiology of alcohol addiction and the pathophysiology of major depressive disorder. He has authored or co-authored more than 400 Journal articles. Kornhuber described novel molecular mechanisms of approved psychotropic drugs, namely that memantine, amantadine, budipine and orphenadrine act as low-affinity NMDA-receptor antagonists. The data obtained with memantine formed an important basis for its worldwide approval as an antidementive drug. Kornhuber developed the pharmacokinetic hypothesis explaining the delayed therapeutic effects of antidepressant drugs. Furthermore, he found that antidepressant drugs like amitriptyline and fluoxetine mediate their effects on neurogenesis and behavior by lowering ceramide abundance in the brain. Among his coauthors has been Peter Riederer.

Honors

 Scientific Award of the German Society for Psychiatry (1990)
 Organon-Award of the German Society for Biological Psychiatry (1990)
 Rafaelsen Award of the Collegium Internationale Neuro-Psychopharmacologicum (1994)
 Scientific Award of the Senator Dr. Franz Burda-Foundation (1995)
 Klaesi-Award, Swiss Academy of Medical Sciences (1995)
 Scientific Award for Psychopharmacology of the AGNP (1999)
 Ehrenpreis – Deutscher Förderpreis für Schmerzforschung und Schmerztherapie (2000)
 Award „ZukunftErfindenNRW“ Der HochschulWettbewerb 2011 3. Preis (together with Wiltfang J, Maler M, et al.) (2011)
 Annika Liese-Award (together with Gulbins E) (2014)
 Awards for Good Teaching, University of Erlangen-Nuremberg (2006, 2010, 2013, 2014, 2015)

References

External links 
 Publications in PubMed, Publications in Google scholar

German psychiatrists
German psychotherapists
Living people
1959 births
Physicians from Freiburg im Breisgau
Academic staff of the University of Würzburg
Academic staff of the University of Göttingen
Academic staff of the University of Erlangen-Nuremberg